Ivana Cebakova (born ) is a Czech female volleyball player. She is part of the Czech Republic women's national volleyball team.

She participated in the 2014 FIVB Volleyball World Grand Prix.
On club level she played for VK Kralovo Pole in 2014.

References

External links
 Profile at FIVB.org

1986 births
Living people
Czech women's volleyball players
Place of birth missing (living people)